George Huddleston (November 11, 1869 – February 29, 1960) was a U.S. Representative from Alabama, father of George Huddleston, Jr.

Life and career
Huddleston was born on a farm near Lebanon, Tennessee, the son of Nancy Emeline (Sherrill) and Joseph Franklin Huddleston. Huddleston attended the common schools. He studied law at Cumberland School of Law at Cumberland University, Lebanon, Tennessee. He was admitted to the bar in 1891 and practiced in Birmingham, Alabama, until 1911, when he retired from practice.

During the Spanish–American War, Huddleston served as a private in the First Regiment, Alabama Volunteer Infantry.

Huddleston was elected as a Democrat to the Sixty-fourth and to the ten succeeding Congresses (March 4, 1915 – January 3, 1937), representing Alabama's 9th congressional district. He generally championed progressive laws and measures. In March 1932, Huddleston addressed a committee of the United States Senate on the subject of the condition of sharecroppers, stating "Any thought that there has been no starvation, that no man has starved and no man will starve, is the rankest nonsense. Men are actually starving in their thousands today..."
   However, in spite of his opposition to the Ku Klux Klan and race-based violence, he did not support the Dyer Anti-Lynching Bill, fearing for how his majority-white constituency would view him if he voted for it. was an unsuccessful candidate for renomination in 1936, as he lost support among his constituents for opposing bills regarding public services and energy legislation.

Huddleston died in Birmingham on February 29, 1960, and was interred in Elmwood Cemetery.

He is a grandfather of writers George Packer and Ann Packer.

He is the father of Nancy Packer (author, mother of George and Ann), Jane Aaron, Mary Chiles, George Huddleston, and John Huddleston.

Quotes
 "In a time like this...it takes a lion-hearted courage for a man to stand up on his feet and dare to speak for peace." (Spoken during attempts to throw people in jail for speaking for non-intervention during World War I.)

References

Further reading
Barnard, William D. “George Huddleston, Sr., and the Political Tradition of Birmingham.” Alabama Review 36 (October 1983).

External links

1869 births
1960 deaths
Politicians from Birmingham, Alabama
People from Lebanon, Tennessee
Military personnel from Alabama
Cumberland School of Law alumni
Alabama lawyers
United States Army soldiers
Democratic Party members of the United States House of Representatives from Alabama
Burials at Elmwood Cemetery (Birmingham, Alabama)